Lorenzo Chiesa (born 25 April 1976) is a philosopher, critical theorist, translator, and professor whose academic research and works focus on the intersection between ontology, psychoanalysis, and political theory.

Biography
Chiesa is currently a Senior Lecturer in Philosophy at Newcastle University in the United Kingdom. He also teaches at the European Graduate School. Previously, he taught at the University of Kent (2006-2014), where he was a Full Professor of Modern European Thought and founded and directed the Centre for Critical Thought. He was also Visiting Professor in the MA programme in Socio-Political Philosophy of the European University at Saint Petersburg and at the Freud's Dream Museum in Saint Petersburg. Additionally, he served as Director of the Genoa School of Humanities in Italy. 

He held visiting positions at the Freud Museum, London, the University of New Mexico, the Institute of Philosophy of Ljubljana, the Italian Institute of Human Sciences of Naples, the American University of Beirut, and Jnanapravaha Center for Cultural Studies of Mumbai.

He is best known for his monographs on the French psychoanalyst Jacques Lacan published by MIT Press, and translations into English of works by the Italian political philosophers Giorgio Agamben and Paolo Virno, published by Stanford University Press and MIT Press. He serves as editor of the Insubordinations series at MIT Press. He has also written widely on contemporary French and Italian philosophy, biopolitics, Marxism, materialism and atheism.

Chiesa's philosophical treatise Subjectivity and Otherness (2007), which focuses on Lacan's theory of the subject, has been described as setting "a new benchmark of conceptual rigour within the realm of introductory texts on Lacanian thought". His treatment of the implications of psychoanalytic theory for materialism and atheism in The Not-Two (2016) has been extensively discussed by the Slovenian philosopher and Freudo-Marxist theorist Slavoj Žižek in his monograph Disparities. According to the Italian academic and political philosopher Roberto Esposito, Chiesa is "one of the rare philosophers capable of making Lacan’s psychoanalytic apparatus interact with the various languages of continental thought". He has also been referred to as "the leader of a new generation of ‘young Lacanians’, for whom Lacan is primarily a text that needs to be read". Chiesa argues that "psychoanalysis is not intrinsically political" while it is needed to "criticise classical ontology, think new ways in which to approach the question of ontology, and then, from that standpoint, think progressive politics".

Selected bibliography
Authored books and edited volumes
The Not-Two. Logic and God in Lacan (Cambridge MA: MIT Press, 2016) [Turkish translation, Istanbul: Sola Unitas (2019)]
The Virtual Point of Freedom. Essays on Politics, Aesthetics, and Religion (Evanston IL: Northwestern University Press, 2016) [Italian translation, Salerno: Orthotes, 2019]
Biopolitical Theory and Beyond: Genealogy, Psychoanalysis, Biology, special issue of Paragraph, Volume 39, Issue 1 (Edinburgh: Edinburgh University Press, 2016) [edited with Bostjan Nedoh and Marco Piasentier]
Italian Thought Today: Bio-economy, Human Nature, Christianity (London and New York: Routledge, 2014) [edited]
Lacan and Philosophy: The New Generation (Melbourne: Re.press, 2014) [edited]
The Italian Difference: Between Nihilism and Biopolitics (Melbourne: Re.press, 2009) [edited with Alberto Toscano]
Subjectivity and Otherness. A Philosophical Reading of Lacan (Cambridge MA: MIT Press, 2007) [Korean translation, Seoul: Nanjang Publishing (2012), with a new preface] [Russian translation, Saint Petersburg: Skifia Print (2021)] [Turkish translation, Istanbul: Axis (2022)] [German translation, Frankfurt: Neue Deutsch-Franzosische Jahrbucher (2022), with a new preface]
Antonin Artaud. Verso un corpo senza organi (Verona: Ombre Corte, 2001)

Translated books
P. Virno, The Idea of World (Kolkata: Seagull Books, 2022)
P. Virno, Convention and Materialism (Cambridge MA: MIT Press, 2021)
A. Kuliscioff, The Monopoly of Man (Cambridge MA: MIT Press, 2021)
Elvio Fachinelli, The Still Arrow (Kolkata: Seagull Books, 2021)
Giorgio Agamben, What Is Real? (Stanford CA: Stanford University Press, 2018)
Giorgio Agamben, The Adventure (Cambridge MA: MIT Press, 2018)
Giorgio Agamben, What Is Philosophy? (Stanford CA: Stanford University Press, 2017)
Paolo Virno, An Essay on Negation. For a Linguistic Anthropology (London: Seagull Books, 2017)
Giorgio Agamben, The Fire and the Tale (Stanford CA: Stanford University Press, 2017)
Giorgio Agamben, The Kingdom and The Glory: For a Theological Genealogy of Economy and Government (Stanford CA: Stanford University Press, 2011) [with Matteo Mandarini]
Slavoj Žižek, America Oggi: Abu Ghraib e altre oscenità del potere (Verona: Ombre Corte, 2005) 
Slavoj Žižek, Dello sguardo e altri oggetti. Saggi su cinema e psicoanalisi (Udine: Campanotto, 2004) [with Damiano Cantone]
Slavoj Žižek, Il soggetto scabroso – Trattato di ontologia politica (Milan: Raffaello Cortina Editore, 2003) [with Damiano Cantone]

References

External links
Chiesa’s Faculty Homepage at Newcastle University 
Chiesa's profile at The MIT Press
Chiesa's Faculty Homepage at the European Graduate School
Lorenzo Chiesa, keynote lecture, “Why Italian Theory? A Critical Introduction” at “Italian Biopolitical Theory: Life, Power and Theology” conference (UWE, Bristol / Royal Institute of Philosophy), 13–14 March 2015
Lorenzo Chiesa, lecture “Psychoanalysis, Religion, Love” at “Psychoanalysis and Political Theory” international conference (University of Salerno), 6 June 2013
Lorenzo Chiesa, lecture at “Lacan contra Foucault Subjectivity, Universalism, Politics” international conference (American University of Beirut), 31 January 2015
Lorenzo Chiesa, Introduction “The Human Animal in Politics, Science, and Psychoanalysis” international conference (KW Gallery Berlin), 16 December 2011
Lorenzo Chiesa, lecture “About Contemporary Materialist Dialectic” (European University at Saint Petersburg), 15 April 2012
Lorenzo Chiesa, lecture “Pasolini from the Failed Revolution of 1968 to Anthropological Genocide” (The American University of Beirut’s Center for Arts and Humanities – CAH), 9 May 2016
Lorenzo Chiesa, lecture “Jouissance, Inherent Transgression, and Revolution” (Jnanapravaha Mumbai), 6 January 2019
Lorenzo Chiesa, lecture “The Future of an Illusion?” (Newcastle Festival of Philosophy), 22 May 2021
Lorenzo Chiesa, lecture “Freud’s Alibi and Lacan’s New Triumph of Religion” (Lacan in Scotland), 22 April 2021

1976 births
20th-century Italian educators
20th-century Italian essayists
20th-century Italian male writers
20th-century Italian philosophers
20th-century Italian translators
21st-century Italian educators
21st-century Italian male writers
21st-century Italian philosophers
21st-century Italian translators
Academics of Newcastle University
Academics of the University of Kent
Academic staff of the American University of Beirut
Biopolitics
Critical theorists
European University at Saint Petersburg
Italian expatriates in England
Italian expatriates in India
Italian expatriates in Lebanon
Italian expatriates in Russia
Italian expatriates in Slovenia
Italian expatriates in the United States
Italian political philosophers
Italian political writers
Italian–English translators
Jacques Lacan
Living people
Ontologists
Philosophy academics
Philosophers of nihilism
Philosophers of psychology
Translators of Jacques Lacan
Academic staff of the University of Genoa
University of New Mexico faculty
Writers about communism